Change is the first studio recording of the acoustic jazz sextet Origin featuring Chick Corea on piano. The sextet is unchanged except for Jeff Ballard replacing Adam Cruz on drums. The album was released on Rykodisc on June 8, 1999.

Track listing 
 "Wigwam" (Corea) – 6:56
 "Armando's Tango" – 5:54
 "Little Flamenco" – 6:42
 "Early Afternoon Blues" – 6:37
 "Before Your Eyes" – 5:08
 "L.A. Scenes" – 5:36
 "Home" – 7:51
 "The Spinner" – 7:56
 "Compassion [Ballad]" – 7:47
 "Night (Lyla)" (Cohen) – 3:02
 "Awakening" – 6:17

Personnel 
Musicians
 Chick Corea – piano, marimba, handclapping
 Avishai Cohen – double bass
 Jeff Ballard – drums, handclapping
 Bob Sheppard – bass clarinet, flute, baritone saxophone, soprano saxophone, tenor saxophone
 Steve Wilson – clarinet, flute, alto saxophone, soprano saxophone
 Steve Davis – trombone

Production
 Bob Cetti – assistant engineer
 Chick Corea –	producer, executive producer, mixing
 Lourdes Delgado – photography
 Bernie Kirsh – engineer, mixing
 Tom Legoff – photography
 Karen Miller – photography
 Ron Moss – producer, executive producer
 Eric Seijo – assistant engineer
 Darren Wong –	design
 Alan Yoshida – mastering

Chart performance

References

External links 
 

Chick Corea albums
1999 albums
Rykodisc albums